Vasas SC is one of Hungary's major sports clubs. Most of its facilities are situated in Budapest's 13th district in the north of the town. Members of the Hungarian Union of Iron Workers founded the club as Vas- és Fémmunkások Sport Clubja, the "Sport Club of Iron and Metal Workers", on 16 March 1911. The club colours are red and blue.

Vasas FC has won the Hungarian League six times. Vasas is known internationally for reaching the semi-finals of the 1957–58 European Cup season, the quarter-finals in the 1967–68 European Cup season, and for being the most successful club in the Mitropa Cup with 6 championships.

History 

Vasas first entered the Nemzeti Bajnokság I in the 1916–17 season. Since then the club have managed to win seven titles. The club's most successful period has been between 1957 and 1966. During this period they won the Hungarian league five times.

Crest and colours

Naming history 
 1911 - 1925 Vas-és Fémmunkások Sport Clubja
 1926 - 1943 Vasas SC
 1943 - 1944 Nemzeti Nehézipari Munkások Kinizsi SC
 1944 - 1949 Vasas SC
 1949 - 1957 Budapesti Vasas SC
 1957 - 1992 Vasas SC
 1992 - 1993 Vasas SC-Smirnoff
 1993 - 1995 Vasas Ilzer
 1995 - 1996 Vasas Casino Vígadó
 1997        Vasas SC
 1997 - 2001 Vasas Danubius Hotels
 2001 - 2003 Vasas SC
 2003 - 2009? Budapesti Vasas SC
 2009 - 2011 Vasas SC
 2011 – 2012 Vasas–HÍD
 2012 – Vasas FC

Manufacturers and shirt sponsors 
The following table shows in detail Vasas SC kit manufacturers and shirt sponsors by year:

Stadium

Vasas played their home matches in the Illovszky Rudolf Stadion located in the 13th district of Budapest between 1960 and 2016. The stadium capacity was 9,000. The last match was played between Vasas SS and Videoton FC in the 2016–17 Nemzeti Bajnokság I on 29 October 2016. As part of the Hungarian Football Stadium Reconstruction Program, the stadium was demolished in 2016 and a brand new stadium was built in its place.

On 5 July 2019, the new stadium was opened. The first match was played by Vasas SC and FC DAC 1904 Dunajská Streda which was won by the hosts 2–0. The capacity of the new stadium is 5054 and it cost 7.5 billion HUF.

On 7 August 2019, the first Nemzeti Bajnokság II match was played in the stadium when Vasas hosted Soroksár SC in the 2019–20 Nemzeti Bajnokság II season.

On 11 July 2019 the first international match was played between Budapest Honvéd FC and FK Žalgiris in the 2019–20 UEFA Europa League qualifying phase. The match was won by the hosts 3–1.

Honours 
 Hungarian League
 Winners (6):  1957, 1960–61, 1961–62, 1965, 1966, 1976–77
 Hungarian Cup
 Winners (4):  1954–55, 1972–73, 1980–81, 1985–86
 Runners-up (4): 1979–80, 1999–2000, 2005–06, 2016–17
 Mitropa Cup
 Winners (7, record):  1956, 1957, 1962, 1965, 1969–70, 1976–77, 1982–83
 UEFA European Cup
 Semi-finalists (1):  1957–58

Current squad

Out on loan

Youth academy

Ownership
On 4 January 2017 it was announced that János Jámbor bought 99% of the shares of the Vasas FC.

Non-playing staff

Management

First team staff

Twin teams 
On 18 May 2016 a cooperation was announced between Vasas Kubala Akadémia and Eredivisie club SBV Vitesse. According to the cooperation, the two club have a common showcase, take part in a common conference and education. Gerry Hamstra said that it is very important for the Dutch club to initiate new cooperations in this region.
  SBV Vitesse

Trivia 

János Kádár, HSWP First Secretary and Hungarian leader from 1956 until 1988, was a supporter of Vasas. A working-class man, Kádár had played in the team when young and was its president for a short period in the mid-1950s (when, after being released from prison, Kádár was party secretary in Budapest 13th district, where the team is based). During the 1960s, it was not uncommon to see Kádár in the crowd during Vasas games. Unlike some of his Eastern Europe counterparts, though, Kádár did not use his position to favor his team, nor did he allow Hungarian officials to interfere in football as it was common in other bloc countries.

See also 
 List of Vasas SC managers
 List of Vasas SC records and statistics
 List of Vasas SC seasons

References

External links 

   
 Unofficial fan-site (team sports)  

 
Football clubs in Budapest
Sport in Budapest
Association football clubs established in 1911
1911 establishments in Hungary